Better (stylized in all caps) is the debut studio album by American rapper Deante' Hitchcock. It was released on May 13, 2020 through ByStorm and RCA Records, a division of Sony Music Entertainment. It includes features from JID, 6LACK, Young Nudy, Miguel, and St. Beauty. The deluxe edition was released on October 28, 2020, including 9 additional tracks with features from Reason, Guapdad 4000, Ro James, and Kenny Mason.

Background
In 2017, Hitchcock signed with ByStorm and RCA Records, and announced the trilogy Good, Better, and Best, making this album the second project of the trilogy. 

In 2019, Hitchcock was invited to the Revenge of the Dreamers III recording sessions, appearing on the song "PTSD". He later went on the Catch Me If You Can Tour with JID, when the majority of the album was recorded.

Singles
On November 5, 2019, he released the single "How TF" featuring 6LACK, supported by a music video in March 2020. On April 15, 2020, he released the second single "I Got Money Now" featuring JID. On October 21, two singles for the deluxe edition of album were released: "Déjà Vu" and "Text Me".

Critical reception
In a positive review of the album from Uproxx, Aaron Williams said Deante' Hitchcock is "somewhat of a bridge between the dusty funk of soulful Dungeon Family predecessors like Goodie Mob and Outkast and the brand of vibey-but-vapid trap of contemporaries who are off-shoots of the Future/Young Thug family tree. Equal parts T.I. and CeeLo or 21 Savage and JID, Hitchcock gracefully glides along on thundering 808s with spiritual insights and introspective wisdom that has as much appeal for fans of trap tales as it does for folks who love 'real hip-hop.'"

Track listing
Credits adapted from Tidal.

Notes
 "Attitude" and "Shadowman's Interlude" feature uncredited vocals from Dante Clay.
 "Gimmie Yo Money" features uncredited vocals from Yung Baby Tate.

Sample credits
 "I Got Money Now" contains a sample from "Les Fleur" performed by Minnie Riperton.
 "Gimmie Yo Money" contains a sample from "Do It (Stick It Baby)" performed by T.I.

Personnel
Credits adapted from Tidal.

 Elton "L10mixedit" Chueng – mixing engineer
 Mike Bozzi – mastering engineer
 Brandon Phillips-Taylor – recording engineer
 Daniel Vargass – assistant engineer
 Robert Mandiogo – assistant engineer

References

2020 debut albums
RCA Records albums